The Belleza Argentina or well known as "Miss Mundo Argentina" is a national beauty pageant in Argentina to select representatives to the Miss World and Miss Supranational.

History
The Belleza Argentina founded in 2004 under motto "Talent, Sport, Culture and Social Responsibility." by Nadia Cerri, N Entertainment and Nadia Cerri Professional make up. The foundation acquired the Miss World, and Miss Supranational licenses since these licenses dropped by another foundation in Argentina.

The Belleza Argentina chosen runs through the provinces of Argentina conducting an awareness campaign for the prevention of trafficking in persons, and participates in various social and cultural events linked to prevention.

Prior to 2004 the Runner-up title holders from Miss Argentina or previous casting winners participated at the Miss World and Miss International beauty pageant. In history; Argentina has officially two Miss World winners in 1960 and 1978 in and one Miss International winner in 1967.

Titleholders

International pageants
Here the Argentinian representatives at Miss World, Miss International and Miss Grand International under the Belleza Argentina.

Miss World Argentina
Color key

Miss International Argentina
Color key

References

External links
Official website

Argentina
Beauty pageants in Argentina
Recurring events established in 2004
Argentine awards